2012 J.League Cup Final was the 20th final of the J.League Cup competition. The final was played at National Stadium in Tokyo on November 3, 2012. Kashima Antlers won the championship.

Match details

See also
2012 J.League Cup

References

J.League Cup
2012 in Japanese football
Kashima Antlers matches
Shimizu S-Pulse matches